Telstar 18 is a communication satellite in the Telstar series of the Canadian satellite communications company Telesat.

References

Telstar satellites
Spacecraft launched in 2004
2004 in spaceflight
2004 in Canada
Satellites using the SSL 1300 bus
Spacecraft launched by Zenit and Energia rockets